

List
 Carrefour
 Atacadão
 Bretas
 GBarbosa 
 Mercantil Rodrigues
 Perini
 Prezunic
 DIA
 Grupo DMA Distribuidora
 GPA, owned by Groupe Casino
 Assaí Atacadista
 Extra
 Pão de Açúcar
 SHV Holdings
 Makro (pending sale of stores outside São Paulo state to Carrefour)
 Grupo Big, 80% owned by Advent International, 20% by Walmart
 Big
 Big Bompreço
 Super Bompreço
  Sam's Club
 Maxxi Atacado

References

Brazil
Supermarkets of Brazil
supermarkets